For the church of the same name, see Church of St George the Martyr, Preston.

St George's is an electoral ward in Preston, Lancashire, England. The ward is adjacent to the larger Deepdale  to the east and is considered to be more an area within Deepdale than a distinct community of its own. The ward was created in 2002 for the 2002 Preston Council election, taking in the terraces running from Deepdale Road to St Paul's Road adjacent to Moor Park, running south towards the city centre. The eastern parts of the University of Central Lancashire campus in included within the St George's boundaries. Its name comes from the main road running east/west from Deepdale Road to the A6 Garstang Road.
Two members of Preston City Council, elected 'in thirds' in first past the post elections each year, are returned from the ward.
The ward forms part of the Lancashire County Council electoral division of Preston Central South.

Current members

Demographics
From the 2001 census, St George's ward had a population of 5,049. Of this figure, 26.7% described themselves as Muslim. The population at the Census 2011 was measured at 6,084.

See also
Preston local elections

References

 Existing ward arrangements

Wards of Preston
Geography of Preston
Constituencies established in 2002
2002 establishments in England